"Angel of Harlem" is a song by Irish rock band U2. It is the tenth track on their 1988 album Rattle and Hum, and was released as its second single in December 1988. It topped the charts in Canada and New Zealand, and peaked at number nine on the UK Singles Chart, number eight on the Dutch Top 40, number 14 on the Billboard Hot 100, and number one on the Mainstream Rock Tracks chart. Written as a homage to Billie Holiday, it was released with two different B-sides; one was an original U2 song called "A Room at the Heartbreak Hotel," while the other was a live version of Rattle and Hums "Love Rescue Me".

Content
The lyrical content of the song refers to various New York City-area landmarks, including John F. Kennedy International Airport, WBLS radio, and Harlem. It also refers to jazz-related history including John Coltrane and A Love Supreme, Birdland club, Miles Davis and Billie Holiday ("Lady Day").

History
"Angel of Harlem" was written during 1987's Joshua Tree Tour in "a time of experimentation" and immersion by U2 in "the various facets of American roots music". U2 lead singer Bono has said that the writing of the song was inspired by U2's initial trip to New York City: "'We landed in JFK and we were picked up in a limousine. We had never been in a limousine before, and with the din of punk rock not yet faded from our ears, there was a sort of guilty pleasure as we stepped into the limousine. Followed by a sly grin, as you admit to yourself this is fun. We crossed Triborough Bridge and saw the Manhattan skyline. The limo driver was black and he had the radio tuned to WBLS, a black music station. Billie Holiday was singing. And there it was, city of blinding lights, neon hearts. They were advertising in the skies for people like us, as London had the year before'".

The in-studio performance of "Angel of Harlem" that was included in the Rattle and Hum movie dates from a recording session at Sun Studio in Memphis, Tennessee, during the later stages of the third leg of the Joshua Tree Tour.

Cash Box said it is "not their most inspiring cut, but there is a familiarity of sound that should bode for radio play."

The song has also been performed on 2009's U2 360° Tour with dedications to Michael Jackson, and included snippets of "Man in the Mirror" and "Don't Stop 'til You Get Enough." In the Berlin concert of the 360° Tour three young fans from Prague, Czech Republic, held signs asking to play "Angel of Harlem" together with U2, Bono invited them to the stage, the band lent them the instruments and they played the song together. The song was performed sporadically during 2015's Innocence + Experience Tour and The Joshua Tree Tour 2019.

Track listings

Personnel
Bono – vocals, guitar
The Edge – guitar, backing vocals
Adam Clayton – bass guitar
Larry Mullen Jr. – drums, percussion
The Memphis Horns – brass
Joey Miskulin – organ

Charts

Weekly charts

Year-end charts

See also
List of covers of U2 songs – Angel of Harlem

References

1988 singles
U2 songs
RPM Top Singles number-one singles
Number-one singles in New Zealand
Island Records singles
Songs written by Bono
Songs written by the Edge
Songs written by Adam Clayton
Songs written by Larry Mullen Jr.
Songs about New York City
Songs about jazz
Songs about musicians
Commemoration songs
Musical tributes
Song recordings produced by Jimmy Iovine
1988 songs